Jason Temujin Minor is an American artist, writer, and comic book artist.

Biography

Artist
Jason Temujin Minor has worked in the Graphic Arts field for over twenty years. He attended the Joe Kubert School of Cartoon and Graphic Art in 1990 and started his own freelance studio, called Baraka Studios, in 1998. His portfolio covers a wide range of media, including; comic books, 3D graphics, book covers, web design, ad design, Illustration, and fine art.

Comic books
As a comic book artist, he is best known for his work on "The Books of Magic", "Buffy the Vampire Slayer", "Teenage Mutant Ninja Turtles", "Animal Man", and "Deadpool". He has also worked on such diverse titles as "Batman", "X-Men", "Terror Inc.", "Angel", "Shadowman", "Vampirella", "Spider-Man", "The Punisher", "Excalibur", and the Eisner Award winning anthology "The Big Book of Urban Legends". He has collaborated on projects for DC Comics, Marvel Comics, Dark Horse Comics, and Image Comics to name a few. In 1997 Minor co-created the science fiction mini-series, "BrainBanx", with writer Elaine Lee for the short lived Helix imprint of DC Comics.

Video games
In 2000, Jason transition from a 2d comic and graphic artist to a 3d computer game artist. He worked for a short time at the – now defunct – game studio, Kinesoft before going to work for Sony Online Entertainment on their MMO game, Star Wars: Galaxies. He was an environment and character artist on the initial launch of the game and became the lead character artist on Star Wars Galaxies: Episode III Rage of the Wookiees Expansion. He took over as Art Director of Star Wars Galaxies: Live in 2004. 
In 2006, Minor joined the game company, BioWare, to work on their MMO, Star Wars: The Old Republic as the lead character artist.

Writing
Jason has recently started exploring his writing and won an award for his short story, "A Dance in the Woods". He contributed a short story and several illustrations to the horror flash fiction anthology, Flashes of Fear. He is also a member of the San Gabriel Writer's League and writes a monthly, serialized story called Chapter Play.

Bibliography
Comics

1992 The Punisher #72 – Inker
1993 Terror Inc. #9–13 – inker
1993 Hawkman #11 – inker
1993 Excalibur Annual 2 – inker
1993 Cable #8 – inker
1993 Black Orchid Annual 1 – inker
1993 Hardware #8 – inker
1993 TMNT #58,61 – inker
1993–94 TMNT (color) #1–3 – inker
1994 Saint Sinner #5 – inker
1994 Excalibur #76 – inker
1994 Showcase '94 #7 – inker
1994 The Savage Sword of Conan #227  – inker
1994 X-Men, The Wedding Album – inker
1994 Vengeance of Vampirella #4 – inker
1994 Deadpool: Sins of the Past #1–2 – inker
1994 Mantra #13 – inker
1994 Nightman #5 – inker
1994 Big Book of Urban Legends – artist
1994 Big Book of Freaks – artist
1995 Vampirella Strikes #3 – inker
1995 Godwheel #2–3 – inker
1995 Dream Team – Inker
1995 Animal Man #80–89 – inker
1995 X-Men Poster Magazine #3 – inker
1995 Codename: Strykeforce #14 – inker
1996–97 BrainBanx #1–6 – co-creator, artist
1998 Slingers #8,12 – inker
1998–99 The Books of Magic #46–54, 57–58, 70, annual 3 – finishes
1998 Resident Evil #4 – inker
1998 Shadowman #16–18 – inker
1998 Tales of the Witchblade #6 – inker
1998 Buffy The Vampire Slayer #16 – inker
1998 Buffy The Vampire Slayer #20 – penciler
1999 Batman: No Man's Land Gallery  – artist
1999 Batman: Shadow of the Bat #89 – penciler
1999 Angel #3 – inker
1999 Angel #13 – cover artist
1999 Deadpool TPB – inker
1999 JSA Secret Files – artist
2000 Spider-Man vs. The Punisher – inker
2000 Buffy the Vampire Slayer TPB vol.7  – artist
2000 Angel TPB vol. 1 – artist
2008 Buffy the Vampire Slayer Omnibus vol. 3–4 – artist
2009 The Vertigo Encyclopedia – artist

Games

2001–03 Star Wars Galaxies – Character Artist
2003–04 Star Wars Galaxies: Jump to Lightspeed– Character Artist
2005 Star Wars Galaxies: Episode III Rage of the Wookiees – Lead Character Artist
2005 Star Wars Galaxies: Trials of Obi-Wan – Lead Character Artist
2005–06 Star Wars Galaxies: Live – Art Director
2006–Present Star Wars: The Old Republic – Lead Character Artist

References

www.comics.org/temujin
www.comics.org/Jason Minor
comicbookdb.com

External links
jason-minor.com

1971 births
American comics artists
Living people
American male writers